ReDefined was a special episode of Impact! produced by Impact Wrestling, which was taped on August 12, 2018 at The Rebel Complex in Toronto, Ontario, Canada and aired on August 30, 2018.

Five professional wrestling matches were contested at the event. The main event was a tag team match, in which Eddie Edwards and Moose took on Austin Aries and Killer Kross. The match ended in a no contest after Moose turned on Edwards. The undercard featured four matches including Brian Cage retaining the X Division Championship against Fenix and a three-way match for the Knockouts Championship, in which Tessa Blanchard defeated defending champion Su Yung and Allie to win the title.

Event

Preliminary matches
The event kicked off with Brian Cage defending the X Division Championship against Fenix. Cage nailed a superbomb to Fenix to retain the title. oVe attacked Fenix and Pentagon Jr. after the match but Cage made the save for Fenix and Pentagon forcing oVe to retreat.

After the match, Eli Drake cut a promo with two enhancement talents Brandon Tidwell and Mr. Atlantis and challenged one of them for a match. Atlantis wanted to accept the challenge but Drake opted to wrestle Tidwell. Drake nailed a Gravy Train to Tidwell for the quick win and attacked Atlantis after the match.

Later, Su Yung defended the Knockouts Championship against Allie and Tessa Blanchard in a three-way match. Allie escaped a mandible claw by Yung and Blanchard rolled up Allie and pinned her to win the title.

In the penultimate match, Petey Williams took on Rich Swann. Swann countered a Canadian Destroyer by Williams into a Death Valley driver and nailed a Standing Shooting Swann Press for the win. After the match, Swann declared his intentions of pursuing the X Division Championship and Matt Sydal offered to help him but Swann declined his help.

Main event match
The main event was supposed to be a tag team match pitting Eddie Edwards and Moose against the World Champion Austin Aries and Killer Kross but Moose was attacked before the match. Edwards began the match himself. After a back and forth match between both teams, Moose finally joined the match as Edwards nailed a double underhook powerbomb to Kross. Moose then tagged in but turned on Edwards by hitting him with a spear and joined Aries and Kross in triple teaming Edwards.

Reception
Larry Csonka of 411 Mania rated ReDefined 6.8, considering it "a pretty good show that peaked with the opener" and did a nice job of setting up some angles moving forward. The follow up will be key to its overall success."

Results

References

Impact Wrestling shows
2018 in professional wrestling
Professional wrestling in Toronto
August 2018 sports events in Canada
2018 American television episodes
2010s American television specials
2018 in Toronto
Events in Toronto